The Epcot International Flower & Garden Festival is an annual garden festival at Epcot in Walt Disney World Resort in Bay Lake, Florida near Orlando in the spring, typically from early March through late May. The festival is included with regular admission, however, there are a couple events during the festival that do cost extra if guests choose to attend.

History

1995
In 1995 the Festival debuted a new miniature train and town display next to the Germany pavilion. Officially named the Epcot Garden Railway, the display showcased flowers amid the train tracks and buildings, and was so popular, it has been in its same location ever since. Props are added during some festivals to correspond with the official festival signage around the World Showcase lagoon.

2015
The 2015 Festival included the new additions of Anna and Elsa, Goofy About Spring (featuring Goofy, Chip 'n Dale and friends), Kermit the Frog and Miss Piggy topiaries, as well as the return of Spring Is in the Air!, Buzz Lightyear, Cactus Road Rally (featuring Mater and Lightning McQueen), Fantasia, Phineas and Ferb, Farmer Mickey and Minnie (based on American Gothic), Bambi and Friends, Peter Pan, Aurora and Prince Phillip, Beauty and the Beast, Woody, Snow White and the Seven Dwarfs, Lady and the Tramp, The Lion King, Cinderella and Prince Charming, Year of the Ram, and Troll topiaries, as well as the Butterfly Garden. It was also the debut of the Garden Rocks Concert Series, which replaced the Flower Power Concert Series.

2016
The 2016 festival introduced a Huey, Dewey, and Louie topiary, a Ranger Mickey Mouse topiary to celebrate the National Park Service centennial, Floral Sun garden, and the “Fab Five” play garden.

2017
The 2017 festival introduced a Figment topiary, re-imagined princess topiaries and a re-imagined Cars garden, as well as a new front entrance topiary.

2019
2019 brought the expansion of the popular Garden Rocks concerts to nightly as well as a brand new set of topiaries (Bo Peep and her Sheep) celebrating Toy Story 4.

2020
The COVID-19 pandemic caused the festival to go on hiatus until 2022.

See also
 Epcot International Food & Wine Festival

References

External links

Epcot Flower and Garden Photo Gallery
Epcot Flower and Garden Archive

Epcot
Flower festivals in the United States
Festivals in Orlando, Florida
Garden festivals in the United States
1994 establishments in Florida
Festivals established in 1994